The 1995 Preakness Stakes was the 120th running of the Preakness Stakes thoroughbred horse race. The race took place on May 20, 1995, and was televised in the United States on the ABC television network. Timber Country, who was jockeyed by Pat Day, won the race by a half length over runner-up Oliver's Twist.  Approximate post time was 5:33 p.m. Eastern Time. The race was run over a fast track in a final time of 1:54-2/5.  The Maryland Jockey Club reported total attendance of 100,818, this is recorded as second highest on the list of American thoroughbred racing top attended events for North America in 1995. This was the first time in history that Preakness attendance exceeded 100,000.

Payout 

The 120th Preakness Stakes Payout Schedule

$2 Exacta:  (7–10) paid   $266.00

$2 Trifecta:  (7–10–11) paid   $909.60

The full chart 

 Winning Breeder: Lewquest, Ltd.; (KY) 
 Final Time: 1:54 2/5
 Track Condition: Fast
 Total Attendance: 100,818

See also 

 1995 Kentucky Derby

References

External links 

 

1995
1995 in horse racing
1995 in American sports
1995 in sports in Maryland
Horse races in Maryland